DivestOS is a free operating system (OS) based on the Android mobile platform. It is a soft fork of LineageOS that aims to increase security and privacy, and support older devices. As much as possible it removes proprietary Android components and includes only free-software.

DivestOS builds are signed with release-keys so bootloaders may be re-locked on many devices. An automated CVE patcher is used to patch the kernels against many known vulnerabilities.

DivestOS includes few default applications. F-Droid is included with options for selecting several custom F-Droid repositories as well. DivestOS supports using Orbot and Tor Browser as privacy-enhancing features.

History 

The DivestOS project began in 2014, with the first properly signed builds being released in 2015.

The project is the work of one primary developer with contributions from numerous other developers.

Public release of DivestOS was announced on F-Droid forums in June 2020.

Supported devices 

DivestOS primarily supports devices that have been supported by LineageOS.

Reception 
In February 2022, Avoid the hack reviewed DivestOS' Mull browser and said it had several notable features including privacy hardening, and elimination of many proprietary blobs. TechTracker.in said DivestOS is one of few custom ROMs focusing on security and privacy, with monthly and incremental updates.

DivestOS was included in AlternativeTo in December 2021. GNU/Linux.ch Linux and Freie Software News called DivestOS "relatively new and ambitious" and said it supports many devices, both newer and older.

DevsJournal called DivestOS 18.1 one of the best custom ROMs for the One Plus One phone.

DivestOS' Hypatia malware scanner for Android, and how to use their F-Droid repository, was reviewed by Gadget Hacks in March 2021. In November 2021, the Kuketz Security blog said Hypatia was the only malware scanner without tracking libraries of several they reviewed, but said its functionality was limited.

In December 2020 the Replicant project gave credit to DivestOS for finding a proprietary library existing in Replicant, and DivestOS is listed as a project Replicant would be interested in collaborating with more.

DivestOS' F-Droid repositories are listed in F-Droid's "Known Repositories" list.

DivestOS is included in LWN.net list of "embedded distributions".

See also 

 Comparison of mobile operating systems
 List of custom Android distributions
 Security-focused operating system
 Tor Phone

References

External links 
 

Android forks
ARM operating systems
Computing platforms
Custom Android firmware
Embedded Linux distributions
Free mobile software
Free and open-source Android software
Linux distributions
Linux distributions without systemd
Mobile Linux
Mobile operating systems
Operating systems
Operating system families
Smartphones
Software forks